

Events
January 21 – Luigi Boccherini becomes an official composer to Prince Frederick William of Prussia.
February 7 – Joseph II, Holy Roman Emperor, presents a festival at Schönbrunn Palace, at which new compositions by both Wolfgang Amadeus Mozart and Antonio Salieri are performed.
April 28 – Leopold Mozart writes to his daughter, Maria Anna Mozart, predicting failure for his son's latest opera, The Marriage of Figaro. In fact its premiere on May 1 under the composer's baton at the Burgtheater in Vienna is a success with encores demanded. The libretto is by Lorenzo da Ponte.
October 18 – Leopold Mozart is given a blood test on the same day that his daughter-in-law Constanze Mozart gives birth to her third child, Johann Thomas Leopold; the baby dies a month later, Leopold the following year.
November 7 – America's oldest singing society is founded as the Stoughton Musical Society.
November 24 – Carl Ditters von Dittersdorf unsuccessfully seeks employment with the newly enthroned King Frederick William II of Prussia.
In Britain, William Parsons succeeds John Stanley as Master of the King's Musick.
In Benares, Jiwan Shah and Francis Fowke conduct an experiment comparing the pitch of the harpsichord with that of a traditional Indian instrument.
Georg Joseph Vogler is appointed Kapellmeister to King Gustav III of Sweden.

Publications
Johann Wilhelm Hässler – 6 Leichte Sonaten, Theil 1
Leopold Kozeluch – Three Piano Sonatas, Op. 20
Maria Theresia von Paradis – Zwölf Lieder auf ihrer Reise in Musik gesetzt, composed on tour over the previous two years
Christian Friedrich Daniel Schubart – Musicalische Rhapsodien

Classical music
Carl Philipp Emanuel Bach – Funeral music for A. Schulte
Johann Christoph Friedrich Bach – Ino, BR G 48
Cecilia Maria Barthélemon 
Op. 1: Three Sonatas for the Piano-Forte, or Harpsichord, the Second with an Accompaniment for the Violin
6 English and Italian Songs, Op.2
Luigi Boccherini – Symphony in C major, G.515
Carl Ditters von Dittersdorf
Der Apotheker und der Doktor (singspiel)
Giobbe (oratorio)
Xaver Hammer – Gamba Sonata No.1 in D major
Joseph Haydn 
Symphony No. 82 in C ("Bear")
Symphony No. 84 in Eb
Symphony No. 86 in D
Concerto for 2 "Lyra organizzata" Hob.VIIh:3
Cavatina: "Sono Alcina e sono ancora" Hob.XXIVb:9
Recit: "Ah, tu non senti, amico" and Aria: "Qual destra omicida" Hob.XXIVb:10
Wolfgang Amadeus Mozart
Rondo in D for Keyboard, K. 485
Piano Concerto No. 23 in A, K. 488
Duet for Soprano and Tenor, “Spiegarti no poss'io”, K. 489
Scena and Rondo for Soprano, “Non più, tutti ascoltai”, K. 490
Piano Concerto No. 24 in C minor, K. 491
Quartet in E♭ for Piano and Strings, K. 493
Concerto No. 4 in E♭ for Horn and Orchestra, K. 495
Trio No. 2 in G for Piano, Violin and Violoncello, K. 496
Concerto No. 25 in C for Piano and Orchestra, K. 503
Symphony No. 38 in D "Prague", K. 504
Canon for 3 Voices in F major, K.507
Giovanni Paisiello – Amor vendicato, R.2.7
Ignaz Pleyel – Symphony in C major, B.128
Corona Schröter – 25 Lieder
Michel Yost – Clarinet Concerto No.14

Opera
Gioacchino Albertini – Virginia
Bonifazio Asioli – Le nozze in villa
Luigi Boccherini – La Clementina, G.540
Dmitri Stepanovich Bortniansky – Le Faucon
Nicolas Dalayrac – Nina, premiered May 15 in Paris
François-Joseph Gossec – Rosine, ou L’épouse abandonnée
André Grétry – Amphitryon
Lucille Grétry – Le mariage d’Antonio
Wolfgang Amadeus Mozart
Der Schauspieldirektor (The Impresario)
Le nozze di Figaro (The Marriage of Figaro)
Antonio Salieri
Les Horaces
Prima la musica e poi le parole
Giuseppe Sarti – Armida e Rinaldo
Johann Christoph Vogel – La Toison d'or, premiered Sept. 5 in Paris

Published popular music
First edition of Elias Mann's Worcester Collection

Methods and theory writings 

 Francesco Azopardi – Il musico prattico
 Henry Beck – Flute Book
 Antonio D. R. Borghese – L’art musical ramené à ses vrais principes
 João Ribeiro de Almeida Campos – Elementos de Musica
 Johann Adam Hiller – Nachricht von der Aufführung des Händelschen Messias
 Friedrich Wilhelm Marpurg – Legende einiger Musikheiligen
 James Nares – A Concise and Easy Treatise on Singing, with a Set of English Duets for Beginners
 Joseph Riepel – Baßschlüssel
 Ignaz Schweigl – Grundlehre der Violin

Births
January 3 – Johann Christian Friedrich Schneider, composer
February 16 – Grand Duchess Maria Pavlovna of Russia, amateur composer and patron (died 1859)
April 11 – Johann Friedrich Kelz, composer (died 1862)
April 18 – Franz Xaver Schnyder von Wartensee, composer (died 1868)
June 20 – Marceline Desbordes-Valmore, lyricist (died 1859)
June 21 – Charles Edward Horn, singer and composer (died 1849)
July 25 – Giacomo Cordella, composer (died 1847)
September 11 – Friedrich Kuhlau, composer (died 1832)
September 12 – Jean-Louis Tulou, composer (died 1865)
September 26 – August Mühling, German composer (died 1847)
September 27 – José Mariano Elízaga, composer (died 1842)
October 3 – Carl Almenräder, bassoonist (died 1846)
October 21 – Henry Lemoine, composer (died 1854)
November 10 – Carl Eberwein, violinist and composer (died 1868)
November 18
Carl Maria von Weber, composer (or December 18)
Sir Henry Bishop, Professor of Music at Oxford
December 20 – Pietro Raimondi, composer
date unknown
Konstantinos Nikolopoulos, composer (died 1841)
Elena Pucić-Sorkočević, composer (died 1865)

Deaths
January 4 – Moses Mendelssohn, philosopher and grandfather of composers Felix Mendelssohn and Fanny Mendelssohn (born 1729)
January 14 – Michael Arne, composer (born c.1740)
February 16 – Johann Georg Schürer, composer (born 1720) 
March 7 – Frantisek Benda, composer (born 1709)
March 21 – Johann Gottlieb Preller, cantor and composer (born 1727)
April 13 – Jan Tomáš Kuzník, composer and music teacher (born 1716)
May 19 – John Stanley, composer (born 1712)
June 2 – Giovanni Battista Lampugnani, composer (born 1706)
July – Sophia Baddeley, actress and singer (born 1745)
July 5 – Michel Yost, composer (born 1754)
July 29 – Franz Asplmayr, composer (born 1728)
August 2 – François-Louis Gand Le Bland Du Roullet, librettist (born 1716)
August 17 – King Frederick II of Prussia, amateur composer (born 1712)
August 26 – Christoph Christian Sturm, lyricist (born 1786)
September 6 – Karl von Ordóñez, composer (born 1734)
September 18 – Giovanni Battista Guadagnini, musical instrument maker (born 1711)
September 29 – Dietrich Ewald von Grotthuss pianist and composer (born 1751)
October 6 – Antonio Sacchini, composer (born 1730)
December 25 – Christoph Sonnleithner, composer (born 1734)

References

 
18th century in music
Music by year